The Taraos are one of the lesser known tribes of Manipur mostly settled in Chandel district of Manipur.

References 

Scheduled Tribes of Manipur
Naga people
Ethnic groups in Northeast India
Ethnic groups in South Asia